Scarleth Merryl Flores Lozano (born 12 August 1996) is a Peruvian footballer who plays as a defensive midfielder for Club Universitario de Deportes and the Peru women's national team.

International career
Flores represented Peru at the 2012 South American U-17 Women's Championship, the 2013 Bolivarian Games and two South American U-20 Women's Championship editions (2014 and 2015). At senior level, she played two Copa América Femenina editions (2010 and 2014) and the 2019 Pan American Games.

References

1996 births
Living people
Women's association football midfielders
Women's association football fullbacks
Peruvian women's footballers
Footballers from Lima
Peru women's international footballers
Pan American Games competitors for Peru
Footballers at the 2019 Pan American Games
Sport Boys footballers
Club Alianza Lima footballers
Club Universitario de Deportes footballers
21st-century Peruvian women